= Lalandos =

Town of ancient Phrygia

Coordinates: 39°03′49″N 31°05′00″E

Lalandos was a town of ancient Phrygia, inhabited during Roman times.

Its site is located near Yozgat Ören in Asiatic Turkey.
